Park Ha-na (born 14 September 1990) is a South Korean basketball player for Yongin Samsung Blueminx and the South Korean national team.

She participated at the 2018 FIBA Women's Basketball World Cup.

References

External links

1990 births
Living people
Guards (basketball)
People from Gangneung
South Korean women's basketball players
Basketball players at the 2018 Asian Games
Asian Games silver medalists for Korea
Asian Games medalists in basketball
Medalists at the 2018 Asian Games
Sportspeople from Gangwon Province, South Korea